The seventh season of That '70s Show, an American television series, began September 8, 2004, and ended on May 18, 2005. It aired on Fox. The region 1 DVD was released on October 16, 2007. This season is set entirely in 1979.

This is the last season to feature Topher Grace and Ashton Kutcher as regulars. Grace leaves the show at the end of the season to star in Spider-Man 3, and Kutcher to star in The Guardian. However, Kutcher appears five times in the next season as a "Special Guest Star", and Grace makes an uncredited cameo in the series finale. 

All episodes are named after songs by The Rolling Stones.

Cast

Main
Topher Grace as Eric Forman
Mila Kunis as Jackie Burkhart
Ashton Kutcher as Michael Kelso
Danny Masterson as Steven Hyde
Laura Prepon as Donna Pinciotti
Wilmer Valderrama as Fez
Debra Jo Rupp as Kitty Forman
Kurtwood Smith as Red Forman
Don Stark as Bob Pinciotti

Special guest
Shannon Elizabeth as Brooke Rockwell
Luke Wilson as Casey
Tim Reid as William Barnett
Lindsay Lohan as Danielle
Eliza Dushku as Sarah
Tommy Chong as Leo
Chris Elliott as Mr. Bray

Special guest appearance
Tanya Roberts as Midge Pinciotti

Special appearance
Brooke Shields as Pamela Burkhart

Recurring
Jim Rash as Fenton
Megalyn Echikunwoke as Angie Barnett
Bret Harrison as Charlie

Guest
Jack Riley as Old Man Shinsky
Carolyn Hennesy as Patty Ryals
Jenna Fischer as Stacy Wanamaker
Jimmy Pardo as Stan

Episodes

References 

 That '70s Show Episode Guide at The New York Times

External links 
 
 

2004 American television seasons
2005 American television seasons
Television series set in 1979
7